Hydaspia is a monotypic snout moth genus described by Émile Louis Ragonot in 1888. Its single species, Hydaspia dorsipunctella, described by the same author in the same year, is found in Kashmir and South Africa.

References

Phycitinae
Monotypic moth genera
Moths of Asia
Moths of Africa
Taxa named by Émile Louis Ragonot
Pyralidae genera